Urilla Parish located at  is a cadastral parish of Ularara County New South Wales.

History
The Burke and Wills expedition were the first Europeans to the area, passing a few miles to the west.

Climate 
The climate is semi-arid, featuring low rainfall, very hot summer temperatures and cool nights in winter. 
 The parish has a Köppen climate classification of BWh (Hot desert).

References

Parishes of Ularara County
Far West (New South Wales)